Leslie Van Gelder (born January 27, 1969) is an American archaeologist, writer, and educator whose primary work involves the study of Paleolithic Finger Flutings in Rouffignac Cave and Gargas Cave in Southern France.

Working with her husband, the late archaeologist and theologian Kevin J. Sharpe, she spent 10 years developing methodologies to study finger flutings. Their work, building on the internal analysis concepts established by Alexander Marshack, was the first to be able to establish unique identities of cave artists through the study of individual hands and the application of 2D:4D finger studies. Their work on finger flutings was the first to show symbolic behavior by children in the Paleolithic through the creation of tectiforms in Rouffignac. Later work showed the role of women and children in the creation of cave art in Rouffignac. Their application of Zipf's Law from communications theory also gave the first replicable methodology for determining whether or not fluted panels represented purposeful communication or a proto form of writing. Today Van Gelder continues to research in Rouffignac and Gargas caves and lectures internationally. Her current research focuses on the role of children in both caves. She is a Program Director at Walden University's Richard W. Riley College of Education and Leadership.

Biography
Van Gelder was born in 1969 in Manhattan. As daughter of American Museum of Natural History curator Richard Van Gelder, she spent periods of her childhood involved in field work with him in East Africa and in the U.S. National Parks. From 1985–1989 she worked for the Quebec-Labrador Foundation teaching environmental education in outport communities in eastern Canada. Later she taught high school in northern New Jersey and left in 1998 to pursue a PhD in Place Studies at the Union Institute and University for which she was the recipient of the Sussman Award. Her work in Place Studies appeared in a number of journals including the Journal of Implicit Religion, Nature in Story and Legend, Green Letters, as well as within the monograph Weaving a Way Home: A Personal Journey of Place and Story published by the University of Michigan Press 2008.

She is the facilitator of the Roundstone Conversation on Place and Story which has, since 2004, annually brought together writers on the subject of Place and Story to the home of writer cartographer Tim Robinson. Past attendees have included Joseph Meeker, Ron Engel, Patrick Curry, John Elder, Moya Cannon, Patricia Monaghan, Nuala O'Faolin among others.

She was married to archaeologist and theologian, Kevin Sharpe until his death in 2008. She lives in the Rees Valley of New Zealand near the community of Glenorchy.

Family
She is the widow of Kevin Sharpe. Richard Van Gelder, curator of Mammalogy at the American Museum of Natural History, was her father. Lawrence Van Gelder, her uncle, was a senior editor at The New York Times until his retirement in 2008. Her brother, Gordon Van Gelder, is a Hugo Award-winning science fiction editor. Her brother Russell Van Gelder is chairman of ophthalmology at University of Washington.

Bibliography
 2010: Paleolithic finger flutings and the question of writing. In Whitehouse, R & Piquette, K. (eds). The materiality of writing. London: Cambria Press.
 2010: New methods and approaches in the study of finger flutings. Proceedings from the IFRAO Conference: Pleistocene Art of the World. September 6–11, 2010.
 2010: Ten years in Rouffignac Cave, France: A collective report on a decade of finger flutings research. Proceedings from the IFRAO Conference: Pleistocene Art of the World. September 6–11, 2010.
 2010: Four forms of finger flutings as seen in Rouffignac Cave, France. In Bahn, P. (ed). An enquiring mind: Studies in honor of Alexander Marshack. Oxford: Oxbow Books, 269–285. (With Kevin Sharpe)
 2010: Fluted Animals in the Zone of Crevices, Gargas Cave, France. Proceedings of the Eleventh Congress of the International Federation of Rock Art Organizations, Lisbon, Portugal, September 4–9, 2006. (With Kevin Sharpe)
 2009: Paleolithic finger flutings as efficient communication: Applying Zipf’s Law to two panels in Rouffignac Cave, France. Semiotica 177, 171–190. (With Kevin Sharpe)
 2009: Women and girls as Upper Paleolithic cave ‘artists’: Deciphering the sexes of finger fluters in Rouffignac Cave, Oxford Journal of Archaeology. 28:4, 323–333. (With Kevin Sharpe)
 2009: When the stories fled. Irish Pages. 4:2.
 2008: Weaving a Way Home: A Personal Journey Exploring Place and Story (University of Michigan Press).
 2007: Human uniqueness and Upper Paleolithic ‘Art’: An archaeologist’s reaction to Wentzel Van Huyssteen’s Gifford Lectures. American Journal of Theology and Philosophy. 28: 3, 311–345. (With Kevin Sharpe)
 2007: More about ‘More about finger flutings.’ Rock Art Research 24:1, 133–135. (With Kevin Sharpe)
 2006: Evidence of cave marking by Paleolithic children. Antiquity 80:310, 937–947. (With Kevin Sharpe)
 2006:  The study of finger flutings. Cambridge Archaeological Journal 16:3, 281–295. (With Kevin Sharpe)
 2006:  Finger flutings in Chamber A1 of Rouffignac Cave, France. Rock Art Research 23:2, 179–198. (With Kevin Sharpe)
 2006: A method for studying finger flutings. In Exploring the Mind of Ancient Man: Festschrift to Robert G. Bednarik, ed. P. Chenna Reddy. New Delhi: Research India Press.
 2005: The gift of the anthropomorphic mind. Nature in Story and Legend. Fall: 8–13.
 2005: Techniques for studying finger flutings. Society of Primitive Technology Bulletin 30, 68–74. (With Kevin Sharpe)
 2004: Children and Paleolithic ‘art’: indications from Rouffignac Cave, France. International Newsletter on Rock Art 38:9–17. (With Kevin Sharpe)
 2004: At the confluence of paradox: Implicit religion and the wild.” Journal of Implicit Religion. 7:3, 207–222.
 2004: Childhood in the church of Darwin. In Progress and Process. Terra Nova Monograph Series. Cambridge Mass: MIT Press.

References

External links
 Andrew Howley "Mysteries of Rock Art Probed", National Geographic blog, September 7, 2010
 Andrew Howley "Cracking the Code in the Rocks", National Geographic blog, September 10, 2010
 Bruce Bower "Children of Prehistory: Stone Age Children Left Their Mark on Cave Art and Stone Tools", Science News, April 28, 2007
 Kevin Sharpe

Living people
1969 births
American non-fiction writers
American educators
People from Manhattan
American archaeologists
American women archaeologists
American women non-fiction writers
21st-century American women